West Caln Township is a township in Chester County, Pennsylvania, United States. The population was 9,014 at the 2010 census.

History
The Hatfield-Hibernia Historic District, Hibernia House, and Sandy Hill Tavern are listed on the National Register of Historic Places.

Geography

Demographics

At the 2010 census, the township was 91.7% non-Hispanic White, 3.9% Black or African American, 0.2% Native American, 0.7% Asian, and 1.8% were two or more races. 2.3% of the population were of Hispanic or Latino ancestry.

At the 2000 census there were 7,054 people, 2,406 households, and 1,977 families living in the township.  The population density was 324.3 people per square mile (125.2/km2).  There were 2,458 housing units at an average density of 113.0/sq mi (43.6/km2).  The racial makeup of the township was 95.55% White, 2.62% African American, 0.17% Native American, 0.35% Asian, 0.04% Pacific Islander, 0.45% from other races, and 0.81% from two or more races. Hispanic or Latino of any race were 0.98%.

There were 2,406 households, 39.9% had children under the age of 18 living with them, 71.5% were married couples living together, 6.5% had a female householder with no husband present, and 17.8% were non-families. 13.5% of households were made up of individuals, and 4.0% were one person aged 65 or older.  The average household size was 2.92 and the average family size was 3.23.

The age distribution was 28.6% under the age of 18, 6.5% from 18 to 24, 31.5% from 25 to 44, 24.3% from 45 to 64, and 9.1% 65 or older.  The median age was 36 years. For every 100 females there were 104.8 males.  For every 100 females age 18 and over, there were 100.5 males.

The median household income was $57,560 and the median family income  was $59,806. Males had a median income of $42,095 versus $28,602 for females. The per capita income for the township was $20,752.  About 3.0% of families and 3.8% of the population were below the poverty line, including 3.6% of those under age 18 and 7.0% of those age 65 or over.

Transportation

U.S. Route 30 is the most prominent road passing through West Caln Township, but only passes through the southern corner briefly without any interchanges. Pennsylvania Route 10 follows Octorara Trail, Kings Highway and Compass Road along a north-south alignment across the western portion of the township. Pennsylvania Route 340 follows Kings Highway along an east-west alignment across the south-central portion of the township, sharing a brief concurrency with PA 10.

References

External links

West Caln Township

Townships in Chester County, Pennsylvania